Black Republican may refer to:

  'Black Republican' , a pejorative name applied to abolitionist members of the Republican Party (United States) before the Civil War; see 
 Various organizations with African-American membership:
 A member of the Negro Republican Party,  a faction of the United States Republican Party in the South during and following the Civil War
 Black-and-tan faction, a faction of the United States Republican Party in the South from the 1870s to the 1960s in opposition to the segregationist 'lily-white movement'
 National Black Republican Association, founded in 2005
 Black Republican cherry, a type of cherry
 Black Republican (song), from Nas's eighth album, Hip-Hop Is Dead

See also 
 Black conservatism in the United States
 Hip Hop Republican, a combined music and politics blog
 List of African-American Republicans
 List of African-American officeholders during Reconstruction